Bonaventure Panet (July 27, 1765 – March 12, 1846) was a businessman and politician in Lower Canada.

Background 
Panet was born in Montreal in 1765, the son of Pierre Panet, who was a lawyer and a judge, and Marie-Anne Trefflé. He was one of the 17 children born to the family, six of whom died in infancy.

He studied at Montreal's Collège Saint-Raphaël. He then moved to Quebec where he set up in business as a merchant at L'Assomption.

In 1786, he married his cousin Marguerite, the daughter of Louis Dunière. He died at L'Assomption in 1846.

Political career 
Panet was elected to the 1st Parliament of Lower Canada for Leinster in 1792 and was reelected in 1796. His cousin, Jean-Antoine Panet, was elected as the first speaker for the assembly. His brother Pierre-Louis and father-in-law were also members of the legislative assembly. The former was elected MP for Cornwallis in the same year Panet was elected in his district.

Panet was elected again for Leinster in 1809; the assembly was dissolved  by Governor James Henry Craig in 1810 and Panet did not run for elected office again. He served as captain in the militia during the War of 1812 and was promoted to major in 1818. Panet was named justice of the peace for Montreal district in 1821 and was also named to various commissions.

References

External links
 

1765 births
1846 deaths
Members of the Legislative Assembly of Lower Canada
Canadian justices of the peace